Terry Emerson Norris  is an American farmer and politician who serves as a member of the Vermont House of Representatives from the Addison-Rutland district as an independent.

Early life and education

Terry Emerson Norris was born in Vermont to Kenneth Milton Norris and Helen Mae Buck as the youngest of fifteen children. He was raised in Shoreham, Vermont, and graduated from Shoreham High School in 1966, where he was president in the seventh grade and treasurer in the eleventh grade. Norris graduated from Tri-State College with a Bachelor of Science in electrical engineering in 1970. He worked as a dairy farmer from 1970 to 2008, with two of his brothers. He married Diane Madeleine Dubois on July 11, 1992. He served on the school board for St. Mary’s School.

Vermont House of Representatives

In January 2017, Alyson Eastman, an independent member of the Vermont House of Representatives, was appointed by Governor Phil Scott to serve as the Deputy Secretary of Agriculture. Norris was appointed to replace Eastman as he is also an independent. He defeated Democratic nominee Barbara Wilson in the 2018 election. He won reelection in the 2020 election against Democratic nominee Ruth Shattuck Bernstein and independent candidate Richard Lenchus.

He serves on the Agriculture and Forestry committee. He endorsed Scott Milne, the Republican nominee, during the 2020 lieutenant gubernatorial election.

Electoral history

References

Living people
21st-century American politicians
Members of the Vermont House of Representatives
Vermont Independents
Year of birth missing (living people)